Komyo may refer to:
Emperor Kōmyō (1322–1380), second Northern Emperor of Japan, or pretender
Empress Kōmyō (701–760), consort of Emperor Shōmu